The 2008 Summer Paralympics were held in Beijing, People's Republic of China, from 6 to 17 September 2008. Approximately 3,951 athletes from 146 National Paralympic Committees (NPC) participated. Overall, 472 events in 20 sports were held; 262 events were opened to men, 176 were opened to women and 34 were mixed events.

{| id="toc" class="toc" summary="Contents"
|align="center"|Contents
|-
|
Archery
Athletics
Boccia
Cycling
Equestrian
Football five-a-side
Football seven-a-side
|valign=top|
Goalball
Judo
Powerlifting
Rowing
Sailing
Shooting
Swimming
|valign=top|
Table tennis
Volleyball
Wheelchair basketball
Wheelchair fencing
Wheelchair rugby
Wheelchair tennis
|-
|align=center colspan=3| Medal leaders       References
|}


Archery

Athletics 

† Diane Roy was initially awarded the gold, Shelly Woods the silver and Amanda McGrory the bronze in the women's 5000  m T54. However a re-run of the race was ordered by the International Paralympic Committee following protests by the Australian, US and Swiss teams after 6 competitors were involved in a crash on the penultimate lap. The re-run race resulted in the same three athletes winning medals but in a different order.

†† Rebecca Chin of Great Britain was originally awarded the silver medal in the women's discus throw F37-38 event. Following a challenge to her classification, Chin was deemed ineligible for the event, stripped of her medal, and her results were erased.

* David Weir was initially awarded the gold medal in the men's 800 m T54 but a re-run of the race was ordered after a lane violation was discovered. However, following a letter from Kurt Fearnley and the Australian authorities to the IPC, asking that, in the spirit of sportsmanship, the result not be overturned the re-run was cancelled and the medals reinstated.

Boccia

Cycling

Road cycling

Track cycling

Equestrian

Football five-a-side

Football seven-a-side

Goalball

Judo

Powerlifting

Rowing

Sailing

Shooting

Swimming

Table tennis

Volleyball

Wheelchair basketball

Wheelchair fencing

Wheelchair rugby

Wheelchair tennis

Medal leaders 
Athletes that won at least two gold medals or at least three total medals are listed below.

References

Medal winners
2008 Summer Paralympics medal winners
2008 Summer Paralympics medal winners
2008 Summer Paralympics medal winners